
Gmina Kostrzyn is an urban-rural gmina (administrative district) in Poznań County, Greater Poland Voivodeship, in west-central Poland.

Villages
Apart from the town of Kostrzyn, Gmina Kostrzyn contains the villages and settlements of Antonin, Brzeźno, Buszkówiec, Chorzałki, Czerlejnko, Czerlejno, Drzązgowo, Glinka Duchowna, Glinka Szlachecka, Gułtowy, Gwiazdowo, Iwno, Jagodno, Klony, Leśna Grobla, Libartowo, Ługowiny, Rujsca, Sanniki, Siedlec, Siedleczek, Siekierki Małe, Siekierki Wielkie, Skałowo, Sokolniki Drzązgowskie, Sokolniki Klonowskie, Strumiany, Tarnowo, Trzek, Węgierskie, Wiktorowo and Wróblewo.

Neighbouring gminas
Gmina Kostrzyn is bordered by the gminas of Dominowo, Kleszczewo, Nekla, Pobiedziska, Środa Wielkopolska and Swarzędz.

References
Polish official population figures 2006

Kostrzyn
Poznań County